Charlie Zone is a 2013 Canadian crime thriller drama film directed by Michael Melski and starring Glen Gould and Amanda Crew.

Cast
Glen Gould as Avery Paul
Amanda Crew as Jan

Release
The film was released theatrically in Toronto on March 1, 2013.

Reception
Adam Nayman of The Globe and Mail awarded the film two and a half stars out of four and wrote, "There isn't a whole lot of style to Charlie Zone, but the movie-making is as determined and efficient (and thrifty) as Avery himself."

Bruce DeMara of the Toronto Star also awarded the film two and a half stars out of four and wrote, "Charlie Zone, with its dark vision, intricate plot and noir-ish style, suggests Melski is a Canadian filmmaker to watch."

References

External links